The 2010 Durand Cup is the 123rd edition of the Durand Cup, the third oldest association football competition in the world.
United SC won the 2010 Durand Cup at the Ambedkar Stadium with a 0–1 tie-break win over JCT FC. The 2010 Durand Cup Champions were United SC.

Background

Format
The Durand Cup is scheduled from 17 September to 7 November 2010. The tournament will be conducted in two stages. Stage 1 will be the Qualifying Knock Out Round and Stage 2 will be Quarter Final League round.

Withdrawal
I-League club Dempo withdrew.

Fixtures

First round

Second round

Third round

Fourth round

Group stage
All matches will be played in Delhi

Group A

Group B

Group C

Group D

SemiFinals

Finals

Notes

References

2010–11 in Indian football
Durand Cup seasons
2010 domestic association football cups